MurderDrome is a 2014 Australian action horror sports film written and directed by Daniel Armstrong and starring Amber Sajben.

Plot synopsis
Cherry Skye competes in the sport of roller derby in Australia and ends up falling in love with Brad, which gets the attention of Brad's ex-girlfriend Hell Gazer, who happens to be her derby opponent. This heated love triangle arouses a demon-spirit who wants Skye's soul!

Cast
Amber Sajben as Cherry Skye
Jake Brown as Brad
Rachael Blackwood as Hell Gazer
Kat Anderson as Trans Em
Demonique Deluxe as Demonique
Daisy Masterman as Princess Bitchface
Max Marchione as The Janitor
Pepper Minx as Pepper

Reception
MurderDrome received mixed to negative reviews from critics and audiences.

DailyGrindhouse.com called the film "a gleefully bloody tale of a roller derby team against the supernatural, and it's just as energetic and fun as the sport itself."

Felix Vasquez Jr. from Cinema Crazed wrote in his review "There's still a lot of potential for more great movies about the Roller Derby lifestyle, and MurderDrome just isn't it."

References

External links
 

Australian action horror films
Australian sports drama films
Roller derby films
2010s action horror films
2014 horror films
2010s Australian films